Ezequiel Gaviglio (born December 15, 1987 in San Francisco) is an Argentine football forward for Sportivo Belgrano.

External links
 
 

1987 births
Living people
Argentine footballers
Argentine expatriate footballers
General Paz Juniors footballers
Universitario de Sucre footballers
Naval de Talcahuano footballers
Guaraní Antonio Franco footballers
Club Atlético Douglas Haig players
Sportivo Belgrano footballers
Bolivian Primera División players
Primera B de Chile players
Torneo Argentino A players
Torneo Argentino B players
Association football forwards
Argentine expatriate sportspeople in Chile
Argentine expatriate sportspeople in Bolivia
Expatriate footballers in Chile
Expatriate footballers in Bolivia
People from San Francisco, Córdoba
Sportspeople from Córdoba Province, Argentina